The Streblidae are a family of flies in the superfamily Hippoboscoidea, and together with their relatives the Nycteribiidae, are known as bat flies. They are winged or wingless ectoparasites of bats, and often have long legs. They appear to be host-specific, with different species of bat flies occurring only on particular species of bat hosts, sometimes with multiple species of flies sharing a host bat.

Systematics
The 237 or so species are divided among roughly 33 genera and five subfamilies. The monophyly of this family has not been supported. The streblid subfamily Trichobiinae may be more closely related to the Nycteriboscinae and other lineages in the Nycteribiidae. Several authors favor splitting the family into an Old World lineage consisting of the Ascodipterinae and Nycteriboscinae and a New World lineage containing all other subfamilies. The former would be named Ascodipterinae and the latter would retain the name Streblidae. Alternatively, the Streblidae and Nycteribiidae might be united as a monophyletic family containing all bat flies.

Subfamilies are here listed in presumed order of most ancient to most recently evolved. Selected genera are also given, sorted alphabetically, as too little is known about their interrelationships.

 Subfamily Brachytarsininae Speiser 1900 (sometimes Nycteriboscinae)
Genus Brachytarsina Macquart, 1851
Genus Megastrebla Maa, 1971
Subgenus Aoroura
Subgenus Megastrebla Maa, 1971
Genus Raymondia Frauenfeld, 1855
Genus Raymondiodes Jobling, 1954
 Subfamily Ascodipterinae Monticelli 1898
Genus Ascodipteron Adensamer, 1896
Genus Maabella Hastriter & Bush, 2006
Genus Paraascodipteron Advani & Vazirani, 1981
 Subfamily Nycterophiliinae Wenzel, 1966
Genus Nycterophilia Ferris, 1916
Genus Phalconomus Wenzel, 1984
 Subfamily Streblinae Speiser, 1900
Genus Anastrebla Wenzel, 1966
Genus Metelasmus Coquillett, 1907
Genus Paraeuctenodes Pessôa & Guimarães, 1937
Genus Strebla Wiedemann, 1824
 Subfamily Trichobiinae Jobling, 1936
Genus Anatrichobius Wenzel, 1966
Genus Aspidoptera Coquillett, 1899
Genus Eldunnia Curran, 1934
Genus Exastinion Wenzel, 1966
Genus Joblingia Dybas & Wenzel, 1947
Genus Mastoptera Wenzel, 1966
Genus Megistopoda Macquart, 1852
Genus Megistapophysis Dick & Wenzel, 2006
Genus Neotrichobius Wenzel & Aitken, 1966
Genus Noctiliostrebla Wenzel, 1966
Genus Paradyschiria Speiser, 1900
Genus Parastrebla Wenzel, 1966
Genus Paratrichobius Costa Lima, 1921
Genus Pseudostrebla Costa Lima, 1921
Genus Speiseria Kessel, 1925
Genus Stizostrebla Jobling, 1939
Genus Synthesiostrebla Townsend, 1913
Genus Trichobioides Wenzel, 1966
Genus Trichobius Gervais, 1844
Genus Xenotrichobius Wenzel, 1976
 Subfamily incertae sedis
†Enischnomyia Poinar & Brown, 2012

Morphology

One of the characteristic feature of streblid bat flies is their variable degree of eye reduction. The compound eyes are highly, but variably reduced, with some species containing only rudimentary eye spots. Ocelli are absent in all species. Wing morphology also significantly varies within the family with some species containing fully functional wings, while others contain either reduced (non functional or functional) wings or no wings at all.

Parasites
Streblid bat flies, which are parasites, are themselves infested by fungi of the order Laboulbeniales; these fungi are thus hyperparasites.

References

Further reading
 
 
 
 
 
 
 Wenzel, R.L. & Tipton, V.J. (eds.) (1966): Ectoparasites of Panama. Field Museum of Natural History, Chicago, Illinois, USA.

Ectoparasites
Parasitic flies
Parasites of bats
Brachycera families
Hippoboscoidea
Taxa named by Friedrich August Rudolph Kolenati